New Baltimore Hamlet Historic District is a national historic district located at New Baltimore in Greene County, New York. The district contains 94 contributing buildings and one contributing site. It encompasses the historic core of New Baltimore and includes a collection of residential, commercial, and ecclesiastical structures.  The buildings date from the late 18th to late 19th centuries.  It also includes the New Baltimore Reformed Church and a historic cemetery.

It was listed on the National Register of Historic Places in 1996.

References

Historic districts on the National Register of Historic Places in New York (state)
Federal architecture in New York (state)
Historic districts in Greene County, New York
National Register of Historic Places in Greene County, New York